Todd Woodbridge and Mark Woodforde were the defending champions but lost in the semifinals to Mark Philippoussis and Patrick Rafter.

Philippoussis and Rafter won in the final 6–2, 4–6, 7–5 against Sandon Stolle and Cyril Suk.

Seeds
The top four seeded teams received byes into the second round.

Draw

Finals

Top half

Bottom half

External links
 1997 Stella Artois Championships Doubles Draw

Doubles